Sicily Airport may refer to one of the airports listed below.

 Catania International Airport, serving Catania
 Comiso Vincenzo Magliocco Airport, near Ragusa
 Palermo International Airport, serving Palermo
 Palermo-Boccadifalco Airport, also serving Palermo, used for general aviation
 Lampedusa Airport, serving the island of Lampedusa
 Pantelleria Airport, serving the island of Pantelleria (also used as a military airport)
 Trapani Birgi Vincenzo Florio Airport, serving Trapani (also used as a military airport)
 Trapani-Milo Airport, only used by the Italian Space Agency

Military airports:
 Naval Air Station Sigonella

It may also refer to one of the former airports of Sicily listed here: Former Airports